Monkey Fist may refer to:

 Monkey's fist knot
 Monkey Kung Fu
 Lord Monty Fisk, a villain known as "Monkey Fist" on the Disney animated series Kim Possible; see List of Kim Possible characters

See also
 The Monkey's Paw (disambiguation)